Aneurinibacillus terranovensis is a thermoacidophilic and motile bacterium from the genus of Aneurinibacillus.

References

Paenibacillaceae
Bacteria described in 2005